European route E4 passes from north to south through Sweden from the border with Finland, with a total length of . The Swedish part traverses most of Sweden except the extreme north and the west coast region, and is commonly considered the highway backbone of Sweden, since it passes in the vicinity of many of its largest cities and through the capital Stockholm. In particular, it is the mainline road used by most vehicle traffic, both cars and lorries, between the north (Norrland) and south of Sweden or beyond.

From Haparanda on the Finnish border, it stretches south along the Gulf of Bothnia to Gävle, then on a more inland route southwards. It ends in Helsingborg in Sweden, at the port for the ferry to Helsingør in Denmark. The route intersects with European route E6 just outside Helsingborg, which continues to Trelleborg on the southern coast of Sweden.

History and naming 
The International E-road network convention was signed in 1950, with E4 routed Lisbon-Madrid-Barcelona-Nimes-Geneva-Basel-Frankfurt-Hamburg-Helsingør-Stockholm-Haparanda-Helsinki. The part in Sweden was signposted E4 in 1962. Until 1962, the road Helsingborg–Stockholm was called highway 1, and Stockholm–Haparanda highway 13.
 
Under the new system of European routes which was decided in 1975, but introduced in Sweden in 1992, it was planned to have been a part of E55, but it remains in the pre-1992 designation (E4) within Sweden, because the expenses connected with re-signing this long road portion would be too great. Besides the signs along the road, there are thousands of signs, especially in cities, showing how to reach the E4 road. The road is now fully authorised as E4 by the relevant authority, not as E55.

Route 
North of Gävle the road is of mixed standard. North of Sundsvall, the road passes through several of the larger cities as city streets. 

Upgrade to motorway standard will start in 2018. Construction was restarted in 2022, with the expectation to finish it in 2024. With the exception of the Ljungby bypass, the final stretch of the motorway to be opened was the road between Uppsala and Mehedeby, which was inaugurated on 17 October 2007. The speed limits on the main roads in Sweden were changed on many stretches in October 2008, which saw the introduction of the 120 km/h limit.

The E4 is the fastest road to go from Germany/Denmark to areas north of the Arctic Circle, including places in Norway such as Tromsø or the North Cape.

The route passes through or nearby the cities
Tornio,
Haparanda,
Luleå,
Piteå,
Skellefteå,
Umeå,
Örnsköldsvik,
Härnösand,
Sundsvall,
Hudiksvall,
Söderhamn,
Gävle,
Uppsala,
Stockholm,
Södertälje,
Nyköping,
Norrköping,
Linköping,
Jönköping,
Värnamo,
Ljungby,
and Helsingborg.

Detailed route

References

External links 
 UN Economic Commission for Europe: Overall Map of E-road Network (2007)

04
E0004
E0004
E0004
E0004
E0004
E0004
E0004
E0004
E0004
E0004
E0004
E0004
E0004
E0004